Eretmocera kochi is a moth of the family Scythrididae. It was described by Bengt Å. Bengtsson in 2014. It is found in South Africa (Free State).

References

kochi
Moths described in 2014
Moths of Africa